Macquarie Street may refer to:
Macquarie Street, Hobart
Macquarie Street, Sydney